Au Sable Light is an active lighthouse in the Pictured Rocks National Lakeshore west of Grand Marais, Michigan off H-58.  Until 1910, this aid to navigation was called "Big Sable Light" (not to be confused with Big Sable Point Light near Ludington, Michigan on Lake Michigan or Little Sable Point Light south of Pentwater, Michigan).

History
The Au Sable Light Station was built in 1874 on Au Sable Point, a well known hazard on Lake Superior's "shipwreck coast". The Au Sable Point reef was one of the greatest dangers facing ships coasting along the south shore of Lake Superior during the early shipping days when keeping land in sight was the main navigational method. The Au Sable Point reef was known as a "ship trap" that ensnared many ships, including the passenger ship Lady Elgin which was stranded there in 1859.

The shoreline in this area is considered one of North America's most beautiful, "but in the 1800s it was considered one of the most deadly because of unpredictable features below the surface and violent storms and blinding fogs above."  The reef extends nearly a mile out as a ridge of sandstone a few feet below the surface. The shallow water caught many a vessel following the shore.  Turbulence was common when the lake was "pushed in by violent storms out of the north and northwest." Thick fogs resulted form the mix of frigid lake air and warmth from the sand dunes. "As early as 1622, French explorers called the region 'most dangerous when there is any storms'."

Additionally, the location was chosen to eliminate a "dark spot" in the  stretch between Granite Island Light and Whitefish Point Light.

The lighthouse tower and attached keepers' quarters were designed by Colonel Orlando Metcalfe Poe.  In this capacity he designed eight "Poe style lighthouses" and oversaw construction of several.  Poe was named District Engineer for the Eleventh Lighthouse District, Those lights are New Presque Isle Light (1870) on Lake Huron, Lake Michigan's South Manitou Island Light (1872), Grosse Point Light (1873) in Evanston, Illinois, Lake Superior's Au Sable Light (1874), Racine, Wisconsin's Wind Point Light (1880); Outer Island Light (1874) in the Apostle Islands, Little Sable Point Light (1874) on Lake Michigan, Manistique, Michigan's Seul Choix Light (1895) and Spectacle Reef Light.

The tower is a white brick conical tower with a black lantern. A red brick lightkeeper's house stands next to the lighthouse. It originally had a third-order Fresnel lens, which is now on display at the light station. The lighthouse was automated in 1958 and is currently equipped with a  solar-powered light.

A wooden boathouse was added in 1875; the fog signal building was added in 1897; the keepers' quarters were converted to a duplex in 1909; and the steel oil house was raised in 1915. There is also a second brick Keepers house (1909), a kerosene storage shed (1895), two brick outhouses (1874/1909), a wooden woodshed and boathouse (1875), a brick cistern, and a two vehicle wood frame garage (1954).  Most of these buildings are still extant; only one outhouse remains standing.

The keeper's house was renovated.  A visitor center is on the lower floor and an apartment for volunteer caretakers on the upper floor.

In 1996, the original Third Order Fresnel lens was returned to the tower after 39 years on display at the Pictured Rocks Nautical and Maritime Museum, also known as the Grand Marais Maritime Museum in Grand Marais.  However, it is an external 300 mm lens that is operative.

The steam whistle and airhorn have been removed.  Nevertheless, the "boarded lantern area is an impressive sight."

The lighthouse tower is open to the public in summer.  The complex was maintained by the National Park Service, and the automated light continues to be operated by the United States Coast Guard.  The National Park Service's stated goal is to continue to maintain the lighthouse complex to its 1909–10 appearance, during its first year of operation as a two-person Lighthouse keeper station.

The Light Station is part of the National Park Service's Pictured Rocks National Lakeshore. The Au Sable Light Station is on the National Register of Historic Places, #78000374.

From the Campground the lighthouse is a  walk on a sand trail.

See also
 Lighthouses in the United States

References

Further reading
Terry Pepper, Seeing the Light, Au Sable Point Light at terrypepper.com.
 Taylor, Paul (October 2009) Orlando M. Poe: Civil War General and Great Lakes Engineer (Kent State University Press) ; .
 Torres, Louis, Historic Structure Report, Pictured Rocks Au Sable Light Station (November, 1978).

External links
 
 
 Aerial photos, Au Sable Light, marinas.com.
 Exploring the North, Au Sable Point Light.
 Interactive map of lighthouses in eastern Lake Superior, powered by Google.
 National Park Service Au Sable Point Light Station web page.
 Photograph of the Au Sable Point Lighthouse and Lifesaving Station (ca. 1920), Michigan History, Arts and Libraries archive.
 Satellite view, Au Sable Point Light by Google Maps.
 Au Sable Light Station - United States Lighthouses

Lighthouses completed in 1874
Houses completed in 1874
Lighthouses on the National Register of Historic Places in Michigan
National Register of Historic Places in Alger County, Michigan
Museums in Alger County, Michigan
Lighthouse museums in Michigan
Pictured Rocks National Lakeshore
Michigan State Historic Sites
1874 establishments in Michigan